Choi Ho-sung (born 23 September 1973) is a South Korean professional golfer.

Choi has played on the Korean Tour and OneAsia Tour. He won the 2013 Enjoy Jakarta Indonesia PGA Championship, co-sanctioned by the OneAsia Tour and the Japan Golf Tour, making him eligible for Japan Golf Tour membership. Since 2013 he has played primarily on the Japan Golf Tour. On 24 November 2018, Choi won the Casio World Open on the Japan Tour.

Choi has an idiosyncratic follow-through. His action has been dubbed "The Fisherman Swing" and has won him many fans on social media and elsewhere.

Professional wins (5)

Japan Golf Tour wins (3)

1Co-sanctioned by the OneAsia Tour

OneAsia Tour wins (1)

1Co-sanctioned by the Japan Golf Tour

Korean Tour wins (2)

References

External links

South Korean male golfers
Japan Golf Tour golfers
Sportspeople from North Gyeongsang Province
People from Pohang
1973 births
Living people